Purwodadi is one of the Kelurahans in Kecamatan Tepus, Gunungkidul, Yogyakarta Special Region, Indonesia. A Kelurahan is an administrative village, the lowest level of government administration in Indonesia.

Villages

 Ngande - Ande
 Wuluh
 Cepogo
 Winangun
 Duwet
 Ngandong
 Danggolo
 Kotekan
 Pringsanggar
 Cakbohol
 Gesing I
 Gesing II
 Sureng I
 Sureng II
 Gerotan

Education

Elementary school
 SDN Belik
 SDN Purwodadi I
 SDN Purwodadi II
 SDN Gesing I
 SDN Gesing II
 SD Muhammadiyah Purwodadi

Junior high school
 SMP Muhammadiyah 2 Tepus

Government

Lurah List
 Suprihatin
 Sucipto
 Sagiyanto

Tourism

Beach Tourism
 Pantai Ngetun
 Timang Beach
 Pantai Jogan
 Pantai Lambor
 Siung Beach
 Banyu Nibo

Culture Tourism

 Rasulan
 Wayang Kulit
 Campursari
 Ketoprak / Wayang Orang
 Jathilan
 Reog
 Sadranan
 Kenduri

Sports

Football
 Persipurwa Purwodadi
 PSG Gesing

Volleyball

References

Gunung Kidul Regency